Paulo Corrêa de Araujo, also known as Moska or Paulinho Moska (born 27 August 1967, in Rio de Janeiro) is a Brazilian singer, composer and actor.

He started to play the classical guitar when he was 13 years old, with friends. He graduated in theater and cinema from CAL (Casa de Artes de Laranjeiras), in Rio. He was a member of the band Garganta Profunda, that sang types of songs from Beatles and Tom Jobim to medieval operas. In 1987, he founded the band Inimigos do Rei ("King's enemies"), with old friends from the other band, Luiz Nicolau and Luis Guilherme.

Cinema 
In 2001, Moska worked in the film O Homem do Ano ("The Man of the Year"), starring Murilo Benício. In the movie, Moska plays the professional killer Enoque. The movie is directed by José Henrique Fonseca, story by Rubem Fonseca, Patrícia Melo and José Henrique Fonseca.

He took part in other films like Mulher, in 1998, and Amores Possíveis.

Discography

CDs 
 (1993) Vontade
 (1995) Pensar É Fazer Música
 (1997) Contrassenso
 (1997) Através do Espelho (Ao Vivo)
 (1999) Móbile
 (2001) Eu Falso da Minha Vida o Que Eu Quiser
 (2003) Tudo Novo de Novo
 (2004) Nova Bis – The Best Of (Coletânea)
 (2007) + Novo de Novo
 (2008) Zoombido
 (2010) Muito Pouco – 2 CDs

DVDs 
 + Novo de Novo (2007)

See also 
 Música popular brasileira

References 

Brazilian composers
20th-century Brazilian male singers
20th-century Brazilian singers
Musicians from Rio de Janeiro (city)
1967 births
Living people
Brazilian male actors
Brazilian classical guitarists
Brazilian male guitarists
21st-century Brazilian male singers
21st-century Brazilian singers
Latin music songwriters